Dunøyane Bird Sanctuary is a bird reserve in Svalbard, Norway, established in 1973. It includes islands west of Dunøysundet in Wedel Jarlsberg Land. The protected area covers a total of around 11.9 km2.

The island group of Dunøyane is a nesting site for barnacle goose, common eider and Arctic tern.

References

Bird sanctuaries in Svalbard
Protected areas established in 1973
1973 establishments in Norway
Ramsar sites in Norway